Mira Pratesi Sulpizi (born 28 December 1923) is an Italian composer who is best known for her works for guitar.

Sulpizi was born in Milan. She studied composition with Alberto Soresina at the Universita Cattolica del Sacro Cuore. Her music is published by Casa Ricordi under the names Mira Pratesi and Mira Sulpizi. Her compositions include:

Chamber 

Ballatelle (flute & guitar)
Canzoncelle Napoletane (flute & guitar)
Eight Medieval Songs (guitar)
New Airs and Dances for Young Guitarists
Organ Sonata
Songs of Hope: Five Hebrew Songs (harp)
Wedding Songs: Six Hebrew Melodies (harp)

Piano 

Introduzione-Aria-Finale
Sonata Breve

Vocal 

Ancient Spanish Songs
“Caterina Dei Corai”
Italian Nursery Rhymes (boys’ choir, flute, guitar and percussion)
“Lyrics” (text by Langston Hughes)
Messa Melodica
“Pentecost Eve”
Three Lyrics (text by G. Azzi)
Two Rispetti Toscani

References 

Italian women composers
1923 births
Musicians from Milan
Living people